Ammannia striatiflora is a species in the family Lythraceae that is endemic to northern Australia.

The species is found in the Kimberley region of Western Australia.

References

striatiflora
Plants described in 2013
Rosids of Western Australia